This is a list of  Time Team  episodes from series 5. Each episode in this series is accompanied by an episode of Time Team Extra where the team's historian Robin Bush and a guest look back at the respective excavation.

Episode

Series 5

Episode # refers to the air date order. The Time Team Specials are aired in between regular episodes, but are omitted from this list. Regular contributors on Time Team include: Tony Robinson (presenter); archaeologists Mick Aston, Phil Harding, Carenza Lewis, Neil Holbrook; historians Beric Morley and Robin Bush; Victor Ambrus (illustrator); Stewart Ainsworth (landscape investigator); John Gater (geophysicist); Henry Chapman (surveyor); Mark Corney (Roman buildings); Sue Francis, Steve Breeze (computer graphics).

References

External links
Time Team at Channel4.com
The Unofficial Time Team site Fan site

Time Team (Series 05)
1998 British television seasons